How to Seduce a Woman is a 1974 American comedy film, directed by Charles Martin. It stars Angus Duncan, Angel Tompkins, and Alexandra Hay, and was released in late January 1974.

Plot synopsis
Employees of a well-off con man and lady's man Luther Lucas talk about the 5 women he'd most like to bed. To make this happen he'll spare no expense.

Cast
 Angus Duncan as Luther Lucas
 Angel Tompkins as Pamela Balsam
 Alexandra Hay as Nell Brinkman
 Jo Anne Meredith as Melissa Van Der Meer
 Judith McConnell as Ramona
 Heidi Bruhl as Doctor Winifred Sisters
 Vito Scotti as Bill
 Marty Ingels as Jim
 Hope Holiday as Mary
 Lillian Randolph as Matilda
 Janice Carroll as Estelle
 Kay Peters as Jane
 James Bacon as himself
 Jack Bailey as Mr. Toklas
 Jackie Brett as Sally
 Fran Ryan as Mrs. Toklas
 Joe Alfasa as Guido
 Dita Cobb as Fanny
 Billy Frick as Adolf Hitler
 Dave Barry as Ticket Seller

Notes
In the December 3, 1973 issue of Box Office it was reported that Playboy would feature the actresses who star in the film. That issue of Playboy featured a pictorial of Alexandra Hay titled, "Alexandra The Great".

References

External links 
 
 
 

1974 films
1974 comedy films
American comedy films
Cinerama Releasing Corporation films
Films scored by Stu Phillips
1970s English-language films
Films directed by Charles Martin
1970s American films